The Right Stuff (TRS) is a neo-Nazi and white nationalist blog and discussion forum and the host of several podcasts, including The Daily Shoah. Founded by American neo-Nazi Mike Enoch, the website promotes Holocaust denial, and coined the use of "echoes", an antisemitic marker that uses triple parentheses around names to identify Jews. Alex McNabb, a co-host of The Daily Shoah, was fired from his job as an emergency medical technician following violent and racist comments he expressed on the podcast.

Content and views
The site promotes white supremacy, neo-Nazism, antisemitism, Holocaust denial, and the white genocide conspiracy theory. It cites the work of Kevin B. MacDonald, a former professor of psychology and antisemitic conspiracy theorist, known for claiming there is a Jewish plot to control the world to undermine the interest of white people.

Much of TRS's content is devoted to news and current events as well as Holocaust denial, denying genocidal Nazi policies against Poles, Russians, and other Slavic "Untermenschen". To justify their denial of Nazi atrocities, TRS hosts promote the conspiracy theory that the documentary record establishing these genocides was forged by unspecified Jews or agents of Jews.

Blog and overview
In December 2012, The Right Stuff described itself as "a political and cultural blog" which aimed to unite the "alt-right" and to troll liberals and progressives. Over time, the podcast became more radical, and adopted a conspiratorial neo-Nazi ideology. The blog developed and retains a lexicon defining jargon used by its publications as well as the wider alt-right movement. The website achieved general notice through its promotion of the triple parentheses or (((echo))). In 2014 the show began to use a distortion effect when names of Jews were mentioned during its segment "Merchant Minute". The meme was adapted to text through the use of parentheses, and in the summer of 2016 it became known through a New York Times column on the topic.

The Right Stuff was one of the earliest websites to make use of the term "cuckservative". In addition, the blog was an early proponent of the propaganda film With Open Gates, which attacks multiculturalism and Middle Eastern refugees in Europe, and promotes the conspiracy theory that Jews are bringing the refugees to harm white people.

The blog has seen a steady decline from its peak in 2017. In September 2021, a Southern Poverty Law Center report found that the website had declined in traffic by 87.5% since February 2017, coinciding with a decline in the total number of cast members appearing on The Daily Shoah. In February 2019, Mike Peinovich responded to a data subpoena from the Sines v. Kessler civil lawsuit by stating that TRS had "lost regular listeners," and that many users had "cancelled their accounts and stopped visiting the site."

Doxing incident
In early 2017, Mike Peinovich, the founder of The Right Stuff who had for years operated under the pseudonym Mike Enoch, was doxxed by fellow neo-Nazis, who released biographical information about him that contradicted his professed ideology. The dox revealed that Peinovich's wife was Jewish and that their wedding had featured traditional Jewish rites and chanting. As a neo-Nazi, Peinovich was also mocked upon the revelation of his Serbian surname, in light of Nazi Germany's racial classification of Serbs as subhumans ("Untermenschen"), and the genocide of Serbs perpetrated by the Croatian Ustaše puppet regime.

After the doxxing, some followers of Peinovich reacted angrily to the information that had been revealed. They circulated forged images of him and his wife which derided their ethnicities. Salon journalist Matthew Sheffield posited that Neo-Nazi podcast listeners speculated that Peinovich was Jewish, "controlled opposition", or otherwise disingenuous in his beliefs.

Alex McNabb 
Alex McNabb is a former emergency medical technician (EMT) who appeared on The Daily Shoah under the pseudonym "Dr. Narcan". He was fired from his job as an EMT after racist comments he made on The Daily Shoah came to light, including comparing black patients to animals and claiming to have tortured a young black boy using a catheter needle.

National Justice Party

The National Justice Party (NJP) is an antisemitic white supremacist political organization in the United States that promotes neo-Nazism. It is not a registered party for elections.

The Right Stuff announced the National Justice Party in August 2020, led by Mike Peinovich, with a platform based upon the white genocide conspiracy theory. The party platform also incorporates antisemitic elements, such as calling for mandatory employment discrimination to prevent Jews from working in "vital institutions". The chairmen of the party include several prominent white supremacist and alt-right figures, including Joseph Jordan (also known as Eric Striker), Tony Hovater, Michael McKevitt, Gregory Conte, Warren Balogh, and former member of the neo-Nazi National Alliance, Alan Balogh.

On July 24, 2021, NJP hosted its fifth party event in the Midwest and released a full-length documentary about it. Peinovich held a speech where he called Donald Trump the most Jewish president ever and was controlled by the Jews. The party's leaders also gave "heil Hitler" salutes. NJP had previously hosted a meeting in response to the January 6 United States Capitol attack. NJP held its inaugural event in Millersville Pike just outside Lancaster, Pennsylvania.

NJP members have organized gatherings in Ohio, Wisconsin, and North Dakota to protest what they claim are "anti-white" killings involving black suspects.

NJP is also connected to Antelope Hill Publishing, which publishes books by Nazis and fascists and sells these books at NJP events and on the internet.

See also
White separatism
Neo-Nazism in the United States
Antisemitism in the United States

References

External links
 The Right Stuff

2012 establishments in New York (state)
2020 establishments in the United States
Identity politics in the United States
Alt-right websites
American radio networks
American political blogs
Conspiracist media
Cyberbullying
Holocaust-denying websites
Internet properties established in 2012
Internet trolling
Neo-Nazi organizations in the United States
Neo-Nazi websites
Political Internet forums